Danial John Dyer (born 24 July 1977) is an English actor and presenter. Dyer's breakthrough role was as Moff in Human Traffic, with other notable roles as Mick Carter in EastEnders, Billy the Limpet in Mean Machine and as Tommy Johnson in The Football Factory. Following the success of The Football Factory, Dyer was often typecast in "hard-man" roles, although it was this image that allowed him to present The Real Football Factories, its spin-off, The Real Football Factories International and Danny Dyer's Deadliest Men. Dyer has also worked in theatre, having appeared in three plays written by Harold Pinter, with whom he had a close friendship.

In 2013, Dyer joined the cast of the BBC soap opera EastEnders, in the role of Mick Carter. He had previously turned down a role in 2009, and in his autobiography, Straight Up, said that he would not join the cast until he was "fat, bald and fifty". He won the Serial Drama Performance award at the National Television Awards in 2015, 2016, and 2019. From 2019 until 2022, he presented the BBC game show The Wall.

Early life
Danial John Dyer was born in the Custom House area of London on 24 July 1977, the son of Christine (née Meakin) and Antony Dyer. He has a younger brother, Tony (born 1979), and sister, Kayleigh (born 1986). His parents split up when he was nine and he was raised by his mother in Custom House. He began acting when he was a teen, and was bullied at school so badly by his peers that he lied about taking acting classes.

In 2016, Dyer's family history was the subject of a Series 13 episode of the BBC genealogy series Who Do You Think You Are?, where it was revealed that his family hails from the Poplar area of London. Census records showed many of them working in the manual occupations connected to the docks on the River Thames. Elizabeth married Cromwell's son Gregory Cromwell and, with the Seymour family's assertion to be descended from Edward III (Dyer's 25th generation ancestor), the line can be traced back to William the Conqueror and Charlemagne. In response, geneticist Adam Rutherford argued that an English person being descended from a Plantagenet king was "not remarkable", musing that "almost every Briton" can claim such descent.

Career

Television
Dyer was discovered at a local school by an agent who auditioned him for the part of Martin Fletcher in the Granada Television series Prime Suspect 3 (1993), beginning his acting career at 16. He also appeared on television in episodes of Cadfael (1994), A Touch of Frost (1995), Loved Up (1995), Thief Takers (1996), Highlander and Soldier Soldier (both 1997). His many other television roles include appearances in the 2003 Channel 4 drama Second Generation, directed by John Sen; as Malcolm, main character Michelle's stepfather, in Skins; as a football player in the second series of Hotel Babylon; and as Matt Costello in what was supposed to be the pilot episode for Breathless, a BBC two-part television series in development from BBC Northern Ireland, renamed first Blood Rush and then Kiss of Death, when it premiered on BBC One as a one-part drama on 26 May 2008.

Beginning in 2007, Dyer became the presenter of The Real Football Factories and The Real Football Factories International, a TV documentary series on Bravo, for which he travels, in the former throughout the United Kingdom and in the latter throughout the world, to meet and interview football club fans and hooligans. In Danny Dyer's Deadliest Men, "a gritty and hard-hitting documentary series that sees him venturing into the dark depths of the British underworld and hunting down some of the most notorious and feared men in Britain today", began airing on Bravo in the United Kingdom on 20 October 2008.

In April 2009, he turned down a role in EastEnders, claiming that although he thought the role sounded good, he did not think he could cope with the pressure of additional publicity. In February 2012, Dyer appeared as a paramedic in an episode of Casualty. In March 2013, Dyer appeared as a guest on Celebrity Juice. Dyer appeared in the sixth series of Hollyoaks Later in October 2013, as The White Man. On 1 October 2013, the BBC announced that Dyer had been cast in EastEnders from Christmas 2013, as Mick Carter, the new landlord of The Queen Victoria pub. After he began appearing as Mick, Dyer revealed that he had been offered and had turned down the part of Carl White, who was eventually played by Daniel Coonan. In February 2017, it was announced that Dyer would be taking a "short break" from EastEnders. In January 2022, it was announced that Dyer had quit EastEnders after over eight years in the role of Mick.

In June 2018, Dyer appeared as a guest panelist on Good Evening Britain, a one-off spin-off show of Good Morning Britain, to discuss Britain's exit from the European Union. Dyer described it as a "mad riddle that no one knows what it is" and called the former Prime Minister of the United Kingdom, David Cameron, a "twat". In August 2018, Dyer began narrating MTV reality series, True Love or True Lies. In 2019, Dyer appeared in a history documentary, titled Danny Dyer's Right Royal Family. The two-part series premiered on BBC One on 23 January 2019. Also that year, Dyer co-presented True Love or True Lies on MTV alongside daughter Dani, as well as beginning his presenting role on The Wall on BBC One. After he announced his departure from EastEnders, it was subsequently confirmed that Dyer would also be leaving The Wall.

Film
Dyer is known for his "bad boy" or "hard man" roles in film. Dyer's first film role was in Human Traffic (1999). His subsequent movie work includes Mel Smith's High Heels and Low Lifes (2001) and starring roles in Borstal Boy (2000), Mean Machine (2002) and in four films by the British film director Nick Love: Goodbye Charlie Bright (2001); The Football Factory (2004); The Business (2005); and Outlaw (2007). Among other film roles, he also appeared as the character Steve in Christopher Smith's Severance (2006); as Hayden in Adulthood (2008); and as himself in the feature documentary Tattoos: A Scarred History.

In 2008, he finished filming his roles as Pete and Tom in City Rats and 7 Lives, respectively. April 2009 saw the straight to DVD release of City Rats. Later that year, Dyer completed filming on Jack Said, a Brit noir thriller in which he played Nathan alongside Ashlie Walker, Terry Stone, David O'Hara and Simon Phillips, which was released in November 2009. This film is the prequel to Jack Says, which was released in 2008, and starred Mike Reid.

In 2009, he shot several horror films including Doghouse under the direction of Jake West, and Basement under the direction of Asham Kamboj. He played one of the lead roles in the British vampire film Dead Cert. In June 2010, he was cast for the lead role in the remake of the British horror film The Asphyx, but it failed to secure production finance and was indefinitely shelved. Dyer co-starred with Anna Walton in Deviation, a British dark thriller written and directed by J. K. Amalou.

In 2012, Dyer played the lead role in Ray Cooney's Run For Your Wife. Upon release in 2013, it was savaged by critics, who described it as one of the worst British films of all time. The film took in a mere £747 during its opening weekend.

Theatre
Dyer has performed on stage, most notably in two plays written and directed by 2005 Nobel Laureate Harold Pinter: as the Waiter in the London première of Celebration (2000), at the Almeida Theatre, which transferred to Lincoln Center for the Performing Arts, in New York, as part of the Harold Pinter Festival held there in July and August 2001; and as Foster in the revival of No Man's Land (1975), at the Royal National Theatre, in London, during 2001 and 2002. In March 2008, he played Joey in a revival of Pinter's The Homecoming (1964), directed by Michael Attenborough, at the Almeida Theatre, in London. He also performed in Peter Gill's play Certain Young Men (1999) in London. From 9 September 2009 to 3 October 2009, Dyer appeared as Sid Vicious in a new play called Kurt and Sid in London's West End at the Trafalgar Studios.

Selected other work
Dyer is the voice of Kent Paul in the video games Grand Theft Auto: Vice City (2002) and Grand Theft Auto: San Andreas (2004). He also appears in The Twang's 2007 video for "Two Lovers".

I Believe in UFOs: Danny Dyer, a documentary that sees Dyer journey to various "UFO hotspots" in the UK and the US in hope of experiencing a UFO sighting, was broadcast on BBC Three on 26 January 2010. In 2016, he appeared in drag in the Lucy Rose music video for "Nebraska". In 2020, he began co-hosting Sorted with the Dyers, a podcast alongside daughter Dani.

In 2021, along with Will Mellor, Dyer recorded a new version of Vindaloo for NHS Charities. In January 2022, Dyer quit EastEnders so that he could accept an offer to appear on a Sky series.

Controversies
In 2010, in his capacity as a celebrity agony uncle, Dyer wrote in Zoo that a young male reader could get over his recent break-up with a woman by "going on a rampage with the boys" or to "cut your ex's face, and then no one will want her". The comment was widely criticised by the media and the public, including the chief executive of the Fawcett Society, Ceri Goddard. Dyer later claimed that he was misquoted.

Dyer was quoted in a May 2011 article in NME as wanting to headbutt film critic Mark Kermode. Kermode had mocked and impersonated Dyer on a recent edition of his BBC Radio 5 Live show with Simon Mayo.

Dyer has been an outspoken critic of former Conservative Prime Minister David Cameron. In 2018, he referred to Cameron as a "twat" on live television, while also expressing contempt for Nigel Farage and Brexit. He voted for Brexit, but later changed his mind and considered himself to be a "poster boy" for the campaign to stop it.

Personal life
Dyer resides in Debden, Essex. He began dating Joanne Mas in 1992 but they separated after the birth of their first daughter, future television personality Dani Dyer, in 1996; they began dating other people, but soon started an affair with each other and decided to reconcile. They eventually married on 3 September 2016, after she proposed to him in March 2015. They also have another daughter and a son.

Dyer has been open about his drug use. In his autobiography, he stated, "I've always taken drugs and I probably always will, but there's a difference between having the odd crafty bump up the snout as a reward for a job well done and letting it rule your life." He has advocated for the legalisation of cocaine because he argues that banning it has not worked.

A lifelong football player and follower, Dyer supports West Ham United FC. In December 2007, he became the chairman of Kent League's Greenwich Borough FC, appointed by fellow actor Tamer Hassan, president of the football club. He said, "I just love football and the chance of being involved with a club is like a dream come true." The appointment was actually a publicity stunt to raise the profile of the club.

In 2016, Dyer travelled to Sierra Leone to take part in Sport Relief. He said, "I don't know what to expect when I go over there, but I'm hoping that it will make some kind of difference. It's an honour to be asked."

In 2011, Dyer released an autobiography titled Straight Up. In 2016, he released another autobiography titled The World According to Danny Dyer: Life Lessons from the East End.

Filmography

Film

Television

Video games

Stage
 Certain Young Men (1999), by Peter Gill
 Celebration (2000), by Harold Pinter
 No Man's Land (2001–2002 revival), by Harold Pinter
 The Homecoming (2008 revival), by Harold Pinter
 Kurt and Sid (2009), by Roy Smiles

Awards and nominations

Notes

References

External links

 
 
 

1977 births
20th-century English male actors
21st-century English male actors
English autobiographers
English football chairmen and investors
English game show hosts
English male film actors
English male soap opera actors
English male stage actors
English male television actors
English male video game actors
English male voice actors
English sports journalists
Living people
Male actors from London
People from Canning Town
Television personalities from London